Stéphane Reynaud is a French chef and cookery writer.

Reynaud comes from a family of butchers and pig farmers in the Ardèche region of France.  He lives in Paris with his wife and three children.

His 2005 book Pork and Sons won the 2005 Grand Prix de la Gastronomie Française. Reynaud has appeared on The Martha Stewart Show and National Public Radio’s The Splendid Table.

Bibliography
2007 - Pork and Sons (Phaidon Press) 
2008 - Terrine (Phaidon Press) 
2009 - French Feasts: 299 Traditional Recipes for Family Meals & Gatherings (Stewart, Tabori, & Chang) 
2009 - Rôtis: Roasts for Every Day of the Week (Murdoch Books) 
2010 - Stéphane Reynaud's 365 Good Reasons to Sit Down to Eat (Murdoch Books) 
2012 - Stéphane Reynaud's Barbecue (Murdoch Books) 
2013 - Stéphane Reynaud's Pies & Tarts (Murdoch Books) 
2014 - Stéphane Reynaud's Book of Tripe (Murdoch Books) 
2014 - Stéphane Reynaud's Gourmet Hot Dogs (Murdoch Books)

References

External links
Villa 9 Trois website

Living people
French chefs
French cookbook writers
French food writers
French restaurateurs
People from Ardèche
French male non-fiction writers
Year of birth missing (living people)